Phenomenology may refer to:

Art
 Phenomenology (architecture), based on the experience of building materials and their sensory properties

Philosophy
 Phenomenology (philosophy), processism  of study founded by Edmund Husserl (1859–1938) beginning in 1900
 Process philosophy , a branch of philosophy which studies subjective, objective experiences
 Munich phenomenology, a group of philosophers and psychologists at University of Munich who were inspired by Husserl's work to develop phenomenology after 1900
 Existential phenomenology, in the work of Husserl's student Martin Heidegger (1889–1976) and his followers after 1927
 Phenomenology (Peirce), a branch of philosophy according to Charles Sanders Peirce (1839–1914)
 Philosophy of experience (Hinduism), the phenomenology of experience in Hinduism, first expounded by Gaudapada

Philosophical literature
 Phenomenology of Perception, a book by Maurice Merleau-Ponty
 The Phenomenology of Spirit, a book by Georg Wilhelm Friedrich Hegel

Science
 Empirical research, when used to describe measurement methods in some sciences
 An empirical relationship or phenomenological model
 Phenomenology (physics), a branch of physics that deals with the application of theory to experiments
 Phenomenology (archaeology), the study of cultural landscapes from a sensory perspective
 Phenomenology (psychology), the study within psychology of subjective experiences
 Phenomenology (sociology), the study within sociology of subjective experiences of concrete social realities
 Phenomenology of religion, the study of the experiential aspect of religion in terms consistent with the orientation of the worshippers